Archie Skym (12 July 1906 – 15 June 1970) was an international rugby union player for Wales and played club rugby for Llanelli and Cardiff. Skym played as a prop and was renowned for his strength and vigour and was nicknamed The butcher. An excellent scrummager, he was known to be able to lift opponents in the front row. Skym had good hands and was able to dribble with some skill.

Club career
Due to his father's religious beliefs, Skym was not allowed to play rugby as a child, but during a nine-month miners strike Skym joined a local team, at his home town of Drefach, as something to do. Although an adult when he started playing, he picked up the game quickly and soon moved to Tumble Rugby Club. He impressed in his play and on 26 December 1926 he was playing for top-flight team Llanelli against London Welsh.

Although a Welsh international by early 1928, Llanelli didn't pick him to play once during the 1928/29 season, and by February Skym had enough and left for rival team Cardiff. With regular matches for Cardiff, Skym was back in the Welsh team. An excellent 1931/32 season including a great game for Cardiff against the South African team, saw Skym cement his place at international level. In January 1935, in a match against Swansea, Skym broke his ankle but stayed on the pitch for the entire game. It was injury that ended his international career and he retired from rugby at the end of the season.

International career
Skym played twenty matches for Wales, his first cap was against England on 21 January 1928. He would score two tries, and was part of the Wales team that in 1933 finally beat England at Twickenham.

International matches played
Wales
  1928, 1930, 1931, 1932, 1933, 1935
  1928, 1930, 1931
  1928, 1930, 1931, 1932, 1933
  1928, 1930, 1931, 1932, 1933
  1931

Bibliography

References

 Llanelli RFC history

1906 births
1970 deaths
Barbarian F.C. players
Cardiff RFC players
Glamorgan Police RFC players
Llanelli RFC players
Rugby union players from Carmarthenshire
Rugby union props
Wales international rugby union players
Welsh miners
Welsh police officers
Welsh rugby union players
Carmarthenshire Police officers
Glamorgan Police officers